Powerful People is the title of both the second studio album of Canadian singer Gino Vannelli, and the sixth track on this album. The album was released in 1974, and was produced by Gino and his brother Joe Vannelli. Herb Alpert (who produced Vannelli's first album) is credited as associate producer.

After his debut Crazy Life had failed to chart due to poor record company promotion, Vannelli assembled a band to record his second album. He and brother Joe had played all the instruments on Crazy Life, but Powerful People is characterized by Joe Vannelli's first experiments with synthesizers and the use of session musicians.

The funky "People Gotta Move" was Vannelli's first hit in the United States, when disco music was gaining popularity. The song reached #22 on Billboard Top 100 and #21 in Canada. "Powerful People" reached #34 in Canada. The last track, "Poor Happy Jimmy", is a tribute to American singer Jim Croce, who died in an airplane accident a year earlier. The album was on the Canadian charts four separate times totalling 28 weeks between November 16, 1974, and August 14, 1976.

Track listing

Charts

Personnel

Production 
 Producers – Gino Vannelli and Joe Vannelli 
 Associate Producer – Herb Alpert
 Engineer – Tommy Vicari
 Assistant Engineer – Larry Forkner
 Mastered by Bernie Grundman
 Art Direction – Roland Young 
 Design – Junie Osaki 
 Photography – Jim McCrary and John Rideout

Musicians
 Gino Vannelli – lead and backing vocals
 Joe Vannelli – electric piano, synthesizers, horn and string arrangements 
 Richard Baker – organ, organ bass, synthesizers, horn and string arrangements 
 Graham Lear – drums
 John J. Mandel – percussion
 Tony Golia – bongos, congas
 Lani Hall – backing vocals

References

External links
 Lyrics of "Powerful People" on www.ginov.com
 

Gino Vannelli albums
1974 albums
A&M Records albums
Albums recorded at A&M Studios
Albums produced by Herb Alpert